Óscar Gil Osés (born 14 June 1995) is a Spanish professional footballer who plays as a centre-back for CD Castellón.

Club career

Athletic Bilbao
Born in Peralta – Azkoien, Navarre, Gil joined Athletic Bilbao's youth setup in 2008, aged 13. He made his debuts as a senior with the farm team in the 2012–13 campaign, in Tercera División.

On 21 June 2013 Gil was promoted to the reserves in Segunda División B. He appeared in 22 matches and scored one goal in the 2014–15 season, as the B-side returned to Segunda División after a 19-year absence.

Gil made his professional debut on 24 August 2015, starting in a 0–1 home loss against Girona FC. He scored his first professional goal on 4 April of the following year, netting his team's first in a 2–1 home win against Real Oviedo.

On 16 August 2016, Gil was loaned to Oviedo in a season-long deal. After appearing sparingly, he returned to Athletic and their B-side, now in the third division.

Gil made his first team debut on 25 October 2017, playing the full 90 minutes in a 1–1 Copa del Rey away draw against SD Formentera. The following 29 May, he was released as his contract expired.

Racing Santander
On 2 August 2018, Racing de Santander confirmed the signing of Gil on a one-year contract. A regular starter in his first season as his side returned to the second division, he was rarely used in his second and moved out on loan to CD Atlético Baleares on 21 January 2020.

Amorebieta
On 8 July 2021, Gil moved to second level newcomers SD Amorebieta.

References

External links

1995 births
Living people
People from Ribera Arga-Aragón
Spanish footballers
Footballers from Navarre
Association football defenders
Segunda División players
Primera Federación players
Segunda División B players
Tercera División players
CD Basconia footballers
Bilbao Athletic footballers
Athletic Bilbao footballers
Real Oviedo players
Racing de Santander players
CD Atlético Baleares footballers
SD Amorebieta footballers
 CD Castellón footballers
Spain youth international footballers